Postal Inspector is a 1936 American crime film directed by Otto Brower.

Plot summary 
Bill Davis is a federal postal inspector. When he returns home to Milltown from a business trip in Washington, D.C., he meets singer Connie Larrimore on the plane. When they land, Bill is met by his brother Charlie, who is already acquainted with Connie.

At a nightclub owned by Gregory Benez, where Connie sings, Charlie and Connie hear about a shipment of $3 million in retired currency being scheduled. Benez, who is heavily in debt, schemes with a man named Ritter who has recently lost money as a victim of possible mail fraud.

A flood in a nearby town affects the shipment's route. Charlie goes to the scene with the National Guard and is aided by Connie, who volunteers as a relief worker. Benez and his accomplices rob the shipment. Charlie is in love with Connie and quarrels with his brother when Bill asks if she told Benez about the cash shipment. A speedboat is used to head off the thieves, Benez is sent to prison and Charlie invites his brother to his wedding to Connie.

Cast 
Ricardo Cortez as Inspector Bill Davis
Patricia Ellis as Connie Larrimore
Michael Loring as Charlie Davis
Bela Lugosi as Gregory Benez
Wallis Clark as Inspector Gil Pottle
Arthur Loft as Inspector Gene Richards
David Oliver as 'Butch'
Guy Usher as Evans
Bill Burrud as Billy, The Boy
Harry Beresford as Ritter
Spencer Charters as Grumpy
Hattie McDaniel as Deborah, the maid
 Landers Stevens as Doctor Doyle

Soundtrack 
 "Hot Towel" (Music by Irving Actman, lyrics by Frank Loesser)
 "Let's Have Bluebirds on All Our Wallpaper" (Music by Irving Actman, lyrics by Frank Loesser)

See also
 List of American films of 1936
 Public domain film
 List of films in the public domain in the United States

External links

1936 films
1936 crime drama films
American black-and-white films
American crime drama films
Films directed by Otto Brower
1930s English-language films
1930s American films